Oleg Yuryevich Baklov (born 20 October 1994) is a Russian football player. He plays for FC Ural Yekaterinburg.

Club career
He made his professional debut in the Russian Professional Football League for FC Syzran-2003 on 18 July 2014 in a game against FC Rubin-2 Kazan.

He made his debut for the main squad of FC Ural Yekaterinburg on 25 September 2018 in a Russian Cup game against FC Neftekhimik Nizhnekamsk.

He made his Russian Premier League debut for Ural on 14 September 2019, when he started an away game against FC Spartak Moscow, which Ural won 2–1.

On 2 July 2021, he was loaned to FC KAMAZ Naberezhnye Chelny.

References

External links
 
 

1994 births
People from Sughd Region
Living people
Russian footballers
Association football goalkeepers
PFC Krylia Sovetov Samara players
FC Ural Yekaterinburg players
FC KAMAZ Naberezhnye Chelny players
Russian Premier League players
Russian First League players
Russian Second League players